Lefevrea wittei is a species of leaf beetle of the Democratic Republic of the Congo and Rwanda. It was first described by the Belgian entomologist  in 1942, from specimens collected by Gaston-François de Witte from the Albert National Park between 1933 and 1935.

References 

Eumolpinae
Beetles of the Democratic Republic of the Congo
Beetles described in 1942